The 1989 Skate Canada International was held in Cornwall, Ontario on October 26–28. Medals were awarded in the disciplines of men's singles, ladies' singles, pair skating, and ice dancing.

Results

Men

Ladies

Pairs

Ice dancing

References

Skate Canada International, 1989
Skate Canada International
1989 in Canadian sports 
1989 in Ontario